The Council Bluffs Public Library serves the residents of Council Bluffs, Iowa, United States along with unincorporated and rural areas of Pottawattamie County. Several cities also contract with the library to provide services.  It dates back to 1866. The library is currently located on Willow Avenue. The previous library building on Pearl Street was listed on the National Register of Historic Places in 1999.

History
The public library in Council Bluffs had its beginnings in 1866, when a subscription library was established for males over the age of 12.  The Council Bluffs Library Association was formed in 1878.  The Free Public Library was created in 1882, and it operated out of rented space.  W. S. Baird, a library trustee, contacted the Carnegie Foundation who agreed to fund a new building at $50,000 if the city agreed to provide a site and institute an annual tax of $5,000 to operate the facility.  The foundation was persuaded to raise its grant to $70,000 if the yearly tax was raised to $7,000.   The grant was awarded on January 6, 1903, and the new building was dedicated on September 12, 1905.  It was designed by the Chicago architectural firm of Patton & Miller in the Beaux-Arts-style.  It was the largest Carnegie library built in the state.

The library building became inadequate.  The present library was completed in 1998 for $13.5 million.  It contains  of space.  The Carnegie-funded building has been converted into the Union Pacific Railroad Museum, which opened in 2013.  The city retains ownership of the old building, the Union Pacific Railroad pays for the operating costs, and the library maintains the collection.

List of Contract Cities 
Crescent, Iowa
McClelland, Iowa
Neola, Iowa
Treynor, Iowa
Underwood, Iowa

References 

Library buildings completed in 1904
Library buildings completed in 1998
Buildings and structures in Council Bluffs, Iowa
Beaux-Arts architecture in Iowa
Modernist architecture in Iowa
Public libraries in Iowa
Carnegie libraries in Iowa
Libraries on the National Register of Historic Places in Iowa
National Register of Historic Places in Pottawattamie County, Iowa